Joel Serrano Mercado (born May 17, 1999) is a Puerto Rican footballer who plays as a goalkeeper for Bayamón FC in the Liga Puerto Rico.

On June 9, 2021, Serrano and Puerto Rico national teammate Rodolfo Sulia were both signed by Chicago House AC.

Career statistics

Club

Notes

International

References

External links
 Joel Serrano at the Marshalltown Community College
 Joel Serrano at the Mercy College

1999 births
Living people
Mercy College (New York) alumni
People from Arecibo, Puerto Rico
Puerto Rican footballers
Puerto Rican expatriate footballers
Puerto Rico international footballers
Association football goalkeepers
USL League Two players
Lakeland Tropics players
Expatriate soccer players in the United States
Mercy Mavericks
Bayamón FC players